Sylvester O'Neal Rhem (November 19, 1929 – June 14, 2007) was an African-American police officer and politician.

Rhem was born in Chicago, Illinois and went to the Chicago public schools. He graduated from Englewood High School in 1948. He received his bachelor's degree in public administration from DePaul University.

He then worked as a police officer for the Chicago Police Department before serving in the Illinois House of Representatives from 1981 to 1985 as a Democrat.

Personal life 
Rhem was Catholic and a member of the Knights of Peter Claver.

Notes

1929 births
2007 deaths
Politicians from Chicago
African-American police officers
DePaul University alumni
African-American state legislators in Illinois
Democratic Party members of the Illinois House of Representatives
20th-century American politicians
Englewood Technical Prep Academy alumni
African-American Catholics
Knights of Peter Claver & Ladies Auxiliary
20th-century African-American politicians
21st-century African-American people